Sterling Furniture is Scotland's largest furniture retail development based in Tillicoultry, Clackmannanshire. It was founded in 1974 by Stirling-based furniture retailer George Knowles, who based its concept on the out-of-town retail developments which had been successful in the United States.  He bought and converted a disused mill in Tillicoultry, making it the largest furniture showroom in Scotland.

Knowles later expanded the complex to include a 'Homestore Outlet' and garden centre, and was involved in the development of the "Sterling Mills outlet centre" on land opposite the original furniture warehouse, which was formerly the base of Marshall Construction.

Their television advertisements, starring football commentator Dougie Donnelly have become part of popular culture, together with the phrase "Tillicoultry, near Stirling" (even though Tillicoultry is 10 miles east of Stirling).

Sterling have stores throughout Scotland in Aberdeen, Dundee, Edinburgh (this store was branded as ‘Martin & Frost’ from 2015-2021, but was reverted to a Sterling Home store), Falkirk, Inverness and Uddingston but the Tillicoultry HQ is by far the largest with a Homestore as well as two restaurants and a garden centre.

After the death of George Knowles' son in 2003, Gordon Mearns took over the running of the company. He has expanded the company's stores and profits.

BoConcept store opened in Sterling Furniture in November 2021.

References

External links
 Sterling Furniture website
 Sterling Mills website

Retail companies established in 1974
Companies based in Clackmannanshire
Organisations based in Clackmannanshire
Buildings and structures in Clackmannanshire
Service companies of Scotland
Shopping centres in Scotland
1974 establishments in Scotland
Economy of Clackmannanshire